This is a list of school districts in Louisiana.

The following cities operate their own schools: Baker, Bogalusa, Central, Monroe, and Zachary.

East Baton Rouge Parish

City of Baker School System
Central Community School System
East Baton Rouge Parish School Board
Zachary Community School District

Ouachita Parish

City of Monroe School Board
Ouachita Parish School Board

Washington Parish

City of Bogalusa School Board
Washington Parish School Board

Single-District Parishes

Acadia Parish Public Schools
Allen Parish School Board
Ascension Parish School Board
Avoyelles Parish School Board
Assumption Parish School Board
Beauregard Parish School Board
Bienville Parish School Board
Bossier Parish School Board
Caddo Parish School Board
Calcasieu Parish School Board
Caldwell Parish School Board
Cameron Parish School Board
Catahoula Parish School Board
Claiborne Parish School Board
Concordia Parish School Board
DeSoto Parish School Board
East Carroll Parish School Board
East Feliciana Parish School Board
Evangeline Parish School Board
Franklin Parish School Board
Grant Parish School Board
Iberia Parish School Board
Iberville Parish School Board
Jackson Parish School Board
Jefferson Parish Public Schools
Jefferson Davis Parish School Board
Lafayette Parish Public Schools
Lafourche Parish Public Schools
LaSalle Parish School Board
Lincoln Parish School Board
Livingston Parish School Board
Madison Parish School Board
Morehouse Parish School Board
Natchitoches Parish School Board
New Orleans Public Schools (Orleans Parish)
Plaquemines Parish School Board
Pointe Coupee Parish School Board
Rapides Parish School Board
Red River Parish School Board
Richland Parish School Board
Sabine Parish School Board
Saint Bernard Parish School Board
Saint Charles Parish School Board
Saint Helena Parish School Board
Saint James Parish School Board
Saint John the Baptist Parish School Board
Saint Landry Parish School Board
Saint Martin Parish School Board
Saint Mary Parish School Board
Saint Tammany Parish School Board
Tangipahoa Parish School Board
Tensas Parish School Board
Terrebonne Parish Public School System
Union Parish School Board
Vermilion Parish School Board
Vernon Parish School Board
Webster Parish School Board
West Baton Rouge Parish School Board
West Carroll Parish School Board
West Feliciana Parish School Board
Winn Parish School Board

External links
Louisiana State Department of Education

Schooldistricts
Louisiana
Schooldistricts